Loxton is a town on the south bank of the River Murray in the Riverland region of South Australia. It is located on the lands of the Erawirung people who occupied the area before European colonisation.

At the 2016 census, Loxton had a population of 4,568.   It is a service town for the surrounding districts. Loxton's primary productions are agriculture & horticulture. Citrus fruit, wine grapes, almond and stone fruit trees are prevalent. Loxton is also the main town for the northern part of the Murray Mallee which is a dryland farming and grain cropping area. Loxton High School provides secondary education for the area.

Loxton has a pioneer settlement museum (known as the Loxton Historical Village), preserving the heritage of the mallee region. It is also famous for the "Loxton Lights Up"  Christmas Festival in December each year, and the annual 120m Loxton Gift handicap sprint race held in late February. The town hosts the second round of the Australian HPV Super Series in May annually.

Loxton is the seat of the local government area of the District Council of Loxton Waikerie. It is in the South Australian House of Assembly electoral district of Chaffey and the Australian House of Representatives division of Barker.

The town is home to a variety of service clubs, most notably the Apex Club, Rotary Club and Lions Club.

Media
Historically, Loxton has been home to several newspapers. These include:

 Loxton Clarion (and Murray lands Advocate) (2 July 1925–2 October 1928) - The Loxton Clarion's proprietor, Jack Irving, endeavoured to produce a publication reflecting the concerns of Loxton and surrounding districts. Its articles covered crops, care of livestock, vehicle maintenance, and local sport. From 23 July 1925, it was known as The Loxton Clarion and Murray Lands Guardian. In late 1928, it was absorbed into The Murray Pioneer and Australian River Record.
 Loxton Community Newsletter (June 1956–March 1960) - A monthly newspaper, published by The Loxton District War Memorial Community Centre, and incorporated into the Loxton News in 1960.
 Loxton News (28 April 1960 – 2020) - Irving came out of retirement to found a new newspaper. In 1964 it (like Irving's Clarion) was sold to the Murray Pioneer. The newspaper has gone on to win many Country Press SA awards.

Channels from the following television networks are available in Loxton:
 ABC Television (ABC)
 SBS Television (SBS) 
 WIN Television (7, 9 & 10) as RTS-5A & LRS-34 relays the programming from Seven Network (Seven SA), Nine Network (Nine SA) & Network Ten (10 SA), Sky News Regional and Fox Sports News, with local commercials inserted

Transport
The first form of regular transport to Loxton was paddle steamers on the Murray River. The Loxton railway line was completed in 1914 connecting via Alawoona and Tailem Bend to Adelaide. Loxton today is connected by road to the Sturt Highway which passes nearby at Kingston-on-Murray and is the northern terminus of the Karoonda Highway and eastern terminus of the Stott Highway. The railway now terminates at the Tookayerta grain terminal a few kilometres out of town, but does not carry passengers, and is anticipated to close completely in 2015.

Salt interception scheme 
Loxton is a town with many farms and fruit crops. The joint programme of salt interception schemes to help keep salt out of the River Murray, costing an estimated $60 million, commenced in 2001. This programme was expected to deliver 61 EC at Morgan by December 2007. The partner Governments of New South Wales, Victoria and South Australia and the Commonwealth have agreed that joint salt interception schemes must both be economically and technically feasible.

Loxton Gift
The Loxton Gift athletics carnival offers the most prize money in South Australia apart from the Bay Sheffield held at Glenelg. The program includes races from 70m to 1000m and is the final major South Australian lead-up event to the Stawell Gift held at Easter.

Loxton Pedal Prix 
Since 2014, the streets of the town have been shut off in May for the running of the Loxton Pedal Prix, which is a round of the Australian HPV Super Series. The track incorporates the major central roundabout and the surrounding main streets. It includes two long 600m straights, one uphill and one downhill. The event has proved popular with locals, riders and spectators alike, and is now a mainstay on the Australian HPV Super Series calendar. In 2018 it will be round 2 of the series.

Heritage listings

Loxton has a number of heritage-listed sites, including:

 Bookpurnong Terrace: St Peter's Evangelical Lutheran Church and Hall
 29 East Terrace: Loxton Institute
 6 Pflaum Terrace: Loxton Villa

Notable persons born in Loxton 
 Emily Beaton (b. 1987), Australian netballer.
 Grant Schubert (b. 1980), Australian field hockey gold medallist.
 Sophie Edington (b. 1984), Australian swimmer
 Grantley Fielke (b. 1962), former Australian rules footballer, and winner of the 1985 Magarey Medal.
 Alex Carey (b. 1991), Australian test cricketer
 Tim Storer (b. 1969), Australian independent senator 2018–2019
 Mark deCaux (b. 1965) Host of the popular series The Bush Bee Man

Climate
Loxton experiences a cold semi-arid climate (Köppen climate classification: BSk), Trewartha: BSak); with warm, dry summers; mild dry springs and autumns; and mild, relatively dry winters.

References

External links 

Loxton Tourism
Loxton Football Club
Loxton Golf Club

Towns in South Australia
Populated places on the Murray River
Riverland